Baja is a 2018 American comedy film directed and written by Tony Vidal, and starring Jake Thomas, Chris Brochu, Michelle DeShon, Arienne Mandi and Zoe Corraface.

Premise
During Christmas break, four 22 year-olds on a Mexican road trip seem bound for trouble until they, and their trip, are unexpectedly redeemed by a series of miraculous events.

Cast
 Jake Thomas as Bryan Johnson
 Chris Brochu as Todd Meyer
 Michelle DeShon as Jessica Francis
 Arienne Mandi as Lisa Bolanos / Lorena De Los Rios
 Zoe Corraface as Carmen
 Mark Margolis as Don Primo
 Cynthia Stevenson as Josey Johnson
 Kurt Fuller as Hal Johnson
 José Zúñiga as Luis Bolanos
 Jason Spisak as Burnout
 Andres Londono as Jorge Ramirez
 Toktam Aboozary as Madam

Production
Principal photography took place throughout Baja California Sur in Mexico, including Loreto, Rosarito Beach, Ensenada and Tijuana.

Release
Baja was released in North America via limited release on April 13, 2018.

Reception
The film received mixed reviews from critics. Noel Murray of the Los Angeles Times called the film a "vacation for the mind." Conversely, David Lewis from the San Francisco Chronicle gave the film one out of four stars, noting its lack of inspiration.

References

External links
 
 
 

2018 independent films
American independent films
American buddy comedy films
Films set in Mexico
Films shot in Mexico
Films shot in Tijuana
American comedy road movies
2010s comedy road movies
2018 films
2010s buddy comedy films
2018 comedy films
2010s English-language films
2010s American films